A hot dog (uncommonly spelled hotdog) is a food consisting of a grilled or steamed sausage served in the slit of a partially sliced bun. The term hot dog can refer to the sausage itself. The sausage used is a wiener (Vienna sausage) or a frankfurter (Frankfurter Würstchen, also just called frank). The names of these sausages commonly refer to their assembled dish. Some consider a hot dog to technically be a sandwich. Hot dog preparation and condiments vary worldwide. Typical condiments include mustard, ketchup, relish, onions in tomato sauce, and cheese sauce. Common garnishes include sauerkraut, diced onions, jalapeños, chili, grated cheese, coleslaw, bacon, and olives. Hot dog variants include the corn dog and pigs in a blanket. The hot dog's cultural traditions include the Nathan's Hot Dog Eating Contest and the Oscar Mayer Wienermobile.

These types of sausages were culturally imported from Germany and became popular in the United States. It became a working-class street food in the U.S., sold at stands and carts. The hot dog became closely associated with baseball and American culture. Although particularly connected with New York City and its cuisine, the hot dog eventually became ubiquitous throughout the US during the 20th century. Its preparation varies regionally in the country, emerging as an important part of other regional cuisines, including Chicago street cuisine.

History 

The word frankfurter comes from Frankfurt, Germany, where pork sausages similar to hot dogs originated. These sausages, Frankfurter Würstchen, were known since the 13th century and given to the people on the event of imperial coronations, starting with the coronation of Maximilian II, Holy Roman Emperor, as King. "Wiener" refers to Vienna, Austria, home to a sausage made of a mixture of pork and beef. Johann Georg Lahner, an 18th/19th century butcher from the Franconian city of Coburg, is said to have brought the Frankfurter Würstchen to Vienna, where he added beef to the mixture and simply called it Frankfurter. Nowadays, in German-speaking countries, except Austria, hot dog sausages are called Wiener or Wiener Würstchen (Würstchen means "little sausage"), to differentiate them from the original pork-only mixture from Frankfurt. In Swiss German, it is called Wienerli, while in Austria the terms Frankfurter or Frankfurter Würstel are used.

  It is not definitively known who started the practice of serving the sausage in the bun.  One of the strongest claims comes from Harry M. Stevens who was a food concessionaire.  The claim is that, while working at the New York Polo Grounds in 1901, he came upon the idea of using small French rolls to hold the sausages when the waxed paper they were using ran out.

A German immigrant named Feuchtwanger, from Frankfurt, in Hesse, allegedly pioneered the practice in the American Midwest; there are several versions of the story with varying details. According to one account, Feuchtwanger's wife proposed the use of a bun in 1880: Feuchtwanger sold hot dogs on the streets of St. Louis, Missouri, and provided gloves to his customers so that they could handle the sausages without burning their hands. Losing money when customers did not return the gloves, Feuchtwanger's wife suggested serving the sausages in a roll instead. In another version, Antoine Feuchtwanger, or Anton Ludwig Feuchtwanger, served sausages in rolls at the World's Fair – either at the 1904 Louisiana Purchase Exposition in St. Louis, or, earlier, at the 1893 World's Columbian Exposition, in Chicago – again, allegedly because the white gloves provided to customers to protect their hands were being kept as souvenirs.

Another possible origin for serving the sausages in rolls is the pieman Charles Feltman, at Coney Island in New York City. In 1867 he had a cart made with a stove on which to boil sausages, and a compartment to keep buns in which they were served fresh. In 1871 he leased land to build a permanent restaurant, and the business grew, selling far more than just the "Coney Island Red Hots" as they were known.

Etymology 

The term dog has been used as a synonym for sausage since the 1800s, possibly from accusations that sausage makers used dog meat in their sausages.

In Germany the consumption of dog meat was common in Saxony, Silesia, Anhalt, and Bavaria during the 19th and 20th centuries. The suspicion that sausages contained dog meat was "occasionally justified".

An early use of the term hot dog in reference to the sausage-meat appears in the Evansville (Indiana) Daily Courier (September 14, 1884): even the innocent 'wienerworst' man will be barred from dispensing hot dog on the street corner. It was used to mean a sausage in casing in the Paterson (New Jersey) Daily Press (31 December 1892): the 'hot dog' was quickly inserted in a gash in a roll. Subsequent uses include the New Brunswick (New Jersey) Daily Times (May 20, 1893), the New York World (May 26, 1893), and the Knoxville (Tennessee) Journal (September 28, 1893).

According to one story, the use of the complete phrase hot dog (in reference to sausage) was coined by the newspaper cartoonist Thomas Aloysius "Tad" Dorgan around 1900 in a cartoon recording the sale of hot dogs during a New York Giants baseball game at the Polo Grounds. 

However, Dorgan's earliest usage of hot dog was not in reference to a baseball game at the Polo Grounds, but to a bicycle race at Madison Square Garden, in The New York Evening Journal December 12, 1906, by which time the term hot dog in reference to sausage was already in use. No copy of the apocryphal cartoon has ever been found.

General description

Ingredients 
Common hot dog sausage ingredients include:
Meat trimmings and fat
Flavorings, such as salt, garlic, and paprika
Preservatives (cure) – typically sodium erythorbate and sodium nitrite

Pork and beef are the traditional meats used in hot dogs. Less expensive hot dogs are often made from chicken or turkey, using low-cost mechanically separated poultry. Changes in meat technology and dietary preferences have led manufacturers to lower the salt content and use turkey, chicken, and vegetarian meat substitutes.

Commercial preparation 

Hot dogs are prepared commercially by mixing the ingredients (meats, spices, binders and fillers) in vats where rapidly moving blades grind and mix the ingredients in the same operation. This mixture is forced through tubes into casings for cooking. Most hot dogs sold in the US are "skinless" rather than "natural casing" sausages.

Natural-casing hot dogs 
As with most sausages, hot dogs must be in a casing to be cooked. Traditional casing is made from the small intestines of sheep. The products are known as "natural casing" hot dogs or frankfurters. These hot dogs have firmer texture and a "snap" that releases juices and flavor when the product is bitten.

Kosher casings are expensive in commercial quantities in the US, so kosher hot dogs are usually skinless or made with reconstituted collagen casings.

Skinless hot dogs 
"Skinless" hot dogs use a casing for cooking, but the casing may be a long tube of thin cellulose that is removed between cooking and packaging, a process invented in Chicago in 1925 by Erwin O. Freund, founder of Visking.

The first skinless hot dog casings were produced by Freund's new company under the name "Nojax", short for "no jackets" and sold to local Chicago sausage makers.

Skinless hot dogs vary in surface texture, but have a softer "bite" than with natural casing.  Skinless hot dogs are more uniform in shape and size and cheaper to make than natural casing hot dogs.

Home consumption 
A hot dog may be prepared and served in various ways. Typically it is served in a hot dog bun with various condiments and toppings. The sausage itself may be sliced and added, without bread, to other dishes.

Sandwich debate

There is an ongoing debate about whether or not a hot dog fits the description of a sandwich. The National Hot Dog and Sausage Council (NHDSC) has declared that a hot dog is not a sandwich. Hot dog eating champion Joey Chestnut and former hot dog eating champion Takeru Kobayashi agree with the NHDSC. Merriam-Webster, on the other hand, has stated that a hot dog is indeed a sandwich. United States Supreme Court justice Ruth Bader Ginsburg also weighed in on the matter, stating that a hot dog might be categorized as a sandwich, but ultimately it comes down to the definition of a sandwich. She went on to acknowledge that a hot dog bun is a single roll that is not sliced all the way through and in that way is similar to a submarine sandwich. 

In June 2022, Jon Batiste stated that hot dogs were his favourite kind of sandwiches when he was given the Colbert Questionert by Stephen Colbert.

Health risks

Although hot dogs are cooked during manufacture, it is still recommended that packaged hot dogs are heated to an internal temperature of at least 165 °F (75 °C) prior to consumption.

Most hot dogs are high in fat and salt and have preservatives sodium nitrate and sodium nitrite, which are contributors to nitrate-containing chemicals classified as group 1 carcinogens by the World Health Organization, although this has been disputed. These health concerns have resulted in manufacturers offering alternative product lines made from turkey and chicken, and uncured, low-sodium, and "all-natural" franks.
Hot dogs have relatively low carcinogenic heterocyclic amine (HCA) levels compared to other types of ready-to-eat meat products because they are manufactured at low temperatures.

An American Institute for Cancer Research (AICR) report found that consuming one daily 50-gram serving of processed meat—about one hot dog—increases long-term risk of colorectal cancer by 20 percent. Thus, eating a hot dog every day would increase the probability of contracting colorectal cancer from 5.8 percent to 7 percent. The AICR's warning campaign has been criticized as being "attack ads". The Cancer Project group filed a class-action lawsuit demanding warning labels on packages and at sporting events.

Like many foods, hot dogs can cause illness if not cooked properly to kill pathogens. Listeria monocytogenes, a type of bacteria sometimes found in hot dogs, can cause serious infections in infants and pregnant women, and can be transmitted to an infant in utero or after birth. Adults with suppressed immune systems can also be harmed.

Due to their size, shape, and ubiquitous consumption, hot dogs present a significant choking risk, especially for children. A study in the US found that 17% of food-related asphyxiations among children younger than 10 years of age were caused by hot dogs. The risk of choking on a hot dog is greatly reduced by slicing it. It has been suggested that redesign of the size, shape and texture of hot dogs would reduce the choking risk.

In the United States

Hot dogs are a traditional element of American food culture, having obtained significant cultural and patriotic status from their association with public events and sports since the 1920s. In the US, the term hot dog refers to both the sausage by itself and the combination of sausage and bun. Many nicknames applying to either have emerged over the years, including frankfurter, frank, wiener, weenie, coney, and red hot.  Annually, Americans consume 20 billion hot dogs.

Hot dog restaurants
Stands and trucks sell hot dogs at street and highway locations.  Wandering hot dog vendors sell their product in baseball parks.  At convenience stores, hot dogs are kept heated on rotating grills. 7-Eleven sells the most grilled hot dogs in North America — 100 million annually. Hot dogs are also common on restaurants' children's menus.  Fast-food restaurant chains typically do not carry hot dogs because of its shorter shelf-life, more complex toppings and cooking, and mismatched consumer expectations.  There are also restaurants where hot dogs are a specialty.

Condiments
Hot dogs are commonly served with one or more condiments. In 2005, the US-based National Hot Dog & Sausage Council (part of the American Meat Institute) found mustard to be the most popular, preferred by 32% of respondents; 23% favored ketchup; 17% chili; 9% pickle relish, and 7% onions. Other toppings include sauerkraut, mayonnaise, lettuce, tomato, cheese, and chili peppers.

Condiment preferences vary across the U.S. Southerners showed the strongest preference for chili, while Midwesterners showed the greatest affinity for ketchup.

Variations

American hot dog variations often have misleading names; they are commonly named for the geographical regions that allegedly inspired them instead of the regions in which they are most popular. For example, michigan hot dogs, also known as white hots, are popular in upstate New York, whereas Coney Island hot dogs are popular in Michigan. 
Sauteed bell peppers, onions, and potatoes find their way into New Jersey's deep-fried Italian hot dog. Hot wieners, or weenies, are a staple in Rhode Island where they are sold at restaurants under the misleading name "New York System." Texas hot dogs are spicy variants found in upstate New York and Pennsylvania (and as "all the way dogs" in New Jersey), but not Texas.  In the Philadelphia metro area, Texas Tommy refers to a hot dog variant in which the frank is topped with melted cheese (often cheddar) and wrapped in bacon. In the Midwest, the Chicago-style hot dog is served on a poppy seed bun and topped with mustard, fresh tomatoes, onions, "sport peppers", bright green relish, dill pickles, and celery salt.

The "New York dog" or "New York style" hot dog is a natural-casing all-beef frank topped with sauerkraut and spicy brown mustard, onions optional, invented and popularized in New York City.

Some baseball parks have signature hot dogs, such as Dodger Dogs at Dodger Stadium in Los Angeles, and Fenway Franks at Fenway Park in Boston.

In Canada
Skinner's Restaurant, in Lockport, Manitoba, is reputed to be Canada's oldest hot dog outlet in continuous operation, founded in 1929 by Jim Skinner Sr. Hot dogs served at Skinner's are European style foot-long (30.5 cm) hot dogs with natural casings, manufactured by Winnipeg Old Country Sausage in Winnipeg, Manitoba.

The Half Moon Drive In, also in Lockport, Manitoba, and located directly across the river from Skinner's, was established in 1938 by brothers Peter and Louie Kosowicz. The original drive-in consisted of three wooden buildings shaped like semicircles—one was for takeout, one was for dine-in, and the third was a dance hall and later an arcade. The Half Moon also serves European-style wieners manufactured by Winnipeg Old Country Sausage.  One of the most popular items on the menu is the Moon Dog, consisting of a hot dog topped with cheese, bacon, fried onions, pickles and mustard; the Half Moon serves about 2,000 on an average summer weekend day.

Outside North America

In most of the world, a "hot dog" is recognized as a sausage in a bun, but the type varies considerably. The name is often applied to something that would not be described as a hot dog in North America. For example, in New Zealand a "hot dog" is a battered sausage, often on a stick, which is known as a corn dog in North America; an "American hot dog" is the version in a bun.

Gallery

Records

The hot dog was prepared by Shizuoka Meat Producers for the All-Japan Bread Association, which baked the bun and coordinated the event, including official measurement for the world record. The hot dog and bun were the center of a media event in celebration of the Association's 50th anniversary on August 4, 2006, at the Akasaka Prince Hotel in Tokyo.

On May 31, 2012, Guinness World Records certified the world record for the most expensive hot dog at USD$145.49.  The "California Capitol City Dawg", served at Capitol Dawg in Sacramento, California, features a grilled  all-beef, natural-casing frank from Chicago, served on a fresh-baked herb-and-oil focaccia roll, spread with white truffle butter, then grilled.  It is topped with whole-grain mustard from France, garlic and herb mayonnaise, sauteed chopped shallots, organic mixed baby greens, maple syrup-marinated and fruitwood-smoked uncured bacon from New Hampshire, chopped tomato, moose cheese from Sweden, sweetened dried cranberries, basil olive oil and pear-cranberry-coconut balsamic vinaigrette, and ground peppercorn.  Proceeds from the sale of each  super dog were donated to the Shriners Hospitals for Children.

Hot dogs are a popular food for eating competitions. The record for hot dogs eaten in 10 minutes is 75. This record is held by Joey Chestnut, who achieved this feat at the Nathan's Hot Dog Eating Contest on July 4, 2020, beating his previous record of 74. The last person to hold the record before Chestnut was Takeru Kobayashi. Competitive eater Miki Sudo holds the record for most hot dogs eaten in 10 minutes by a female at 48.5 hot dogs, also setting this record on July 4, 2020. The last person to hold the record before Sudo was Sonya Thomas.

See also

 Advanced meat recovery
 Breakfast roll
 By-products
 Hamburger
 Hot dog variations
 List of hot dogs
 List of hot dog restaurants
 Mechanically separated meat
 Pigs in a blanket
 Sausage bun
 Sausage sandwich
 Vienna sausage

References
Notes

Bibliography

Further reading

External links

 Home page for a PBS documentary about hot dogs
 USDA Fact Sheet on hot dogs

 
American fast food
Articles containing video clips
Cuisine of Chicago
Cuisine of New York City
German-American cuisine
Hot sandwiches
Independence Day (United States) foods
National dishes
Sausage sandwiches
Street food in the United States